Ihor Petrenko (born 10 May 1938) is a Ukrainian athlete. He competed in the men's pole vault at the 1960 Summer Olympics, representing the Soviet Union.

References

1938 births
Living people
Athletes (track and field) at the 1960 Summer Olympics
Ukrainian male pole vaulters
Olympic athletes of the Soviet Union
Place of birth missing (living people)
Universiade bronze medalists for the Soviet Union
Universiade medalists in athletics (track and field)
Medalists at the 1961 Summer Universiade
Soviet male pole vaulters